Adventive plants or adventitious plants are plants that have established themselves in a place that does not correspond to their area of origin due to anthropogenic influence and, therefore, are all wild species that have only been established with the help of humans, in contrast to the native species. 

The term "adventive" is used to describe species that are not self-sufficient, but need an episodic population assistance from their homeland. If, however, an adventive species becomes self-sustaining in its new geographic area, it is then naturalized. The term hemerochory is sometimes used synonymously with this one, but is often restricted to species that were unintentionally brought into the area and then naturalized, sometimes also for species that have firmly established themselves in their new habitat.

Categorization

Depending on the question and perspective, adventitious plants are divided into different subcategories:

Classification according to establishment history

 Archaeophytes were introduced before 1492
 Neophytes were introduced or immigrated after 1492.

The year 1492 is a conventionally chosen reference point. With the "discovery" of America and the age of discovery and colonialism, alien species from other parts of the world came to new areas on a large scale. Most of the archaeophytes immigrated with the introduction of agriculture (in the Neolithic). The status of a species as an archaeophyte is usually deduced (from the location and ecology of the species) and is hardly directly detectable.

Classification according to the degree of establishment

 Agriophytes: species that have invaded natural or near-natural vegetation and could survive there without human intervention. 
 Epecophytes: Species that are only naturalized in vegetation units shaped by humans, such as meadows, weed flora or ruderal vegetation, but are firmly naturalized here.
 Ephemerophytes: Species that are only introduced inconsistently, that will die out of culture for a short period of time, or that would disappear again without a constant replenishment of seeds.

Classification according to immigration route

Spontaneous immigrants (sometimes referred to as "acolutophytes") immigrated on their own without direct human assistance, for example when new locations were created through culture or soil changes.
Companions (sometimes also "xenophytes") were brought in through human transport. Examples would be seed companions, which were unintentionally sown due to their similarity to cultivated plant seeds, or “wool adventures”, which were dragged into the wool fleece during the transport of sheep's wool.

Feral species or cultural refugees in the narrower sense are those that were originally cultivated, but later escaped from the culture and were able to spread on their own. Such descendants of original cultural clans are subject to natural evolution as they become wild and can more or less quickly differ both from the culture form itself and from the original wild clan that preceded the culture.

Habitat
Adventitious plants are often found at freight stations, along railway lines and port areas as well as airports, but also on roads. Seeds of many species were accidentally imported there with the import of goods (so-called agochoria). Occasionally, seed contamination also introduces new plants that could reproduce for a short period of time (so-called speirochory). Agochory and speirochory are sub-forms of hemerochory. The seeds can also hang in wheel arches so that they can be transported and distributed along highways. 

The proportion of adventitious species in open ruderal corridors at such locations can exceed 30% of the flora of these locations. In natural and near-natural vegetation, adventitious plants are much rarer. Their share here is between zero and about 5%.

References

Further reading
 FG Schroeder: On the classification of the anthropochores. In: Vegetatio. 16, pp. 225-238 (1969).

Invasive species
Environmental conservation
Environmental terminology
Habitat
Introduced plants